James Hazlett (January 12, 1926 – August 4, 2010) was an American sports coach who was head football and baseball head coach for several universities in the northeastern United States. He coached at Susquehanna University, Edinboro University of Pennsylvania, and Kean University.

He was a three-sport standout at Susquehanna from 1948 to 1952. In 1950, he was named Little All-America while playing center on the undefeated football team.

Coaching career
Hazlett was the head coach of the football and baseball teams at his first coaching stop, Edinboro. In four seasons his football teams went 13–18–2 overall (7–16–2 in conference play). Hazlett's next school was Susquehanna, where he also coached baseball and football. On the gridiron, the Crusaders went 39–69–3, including an MASCAC North Division title in 1970. Hazlett's last stop came at Kean from 1984 to 1987. In four seasons as the baseball coach, he compiled an overall record of 86–67–3, including two ECAC Tournament appearances in 1985 and 1986. In 1986, the Cougars were ECAC Champions. In football, the Cougars went 23–43–2, leaving his career football coaching record at 75–130–7.

Death
Hazlett died August 4, 2010 at his home in Richmond, Virginia.

Head coaching record

College football

References

1926 births
2010 deaths
People from Tarentum, Pennsylvania
Edinboro Fighting Scots baseball coaches
Edinboro Fighting Scots football coaches
Kean Cougars baseball coaches
Kean Cougars football coaches
Susquehanna River Hawks baseball coaches
Susquehanna River Hawks football coaches
Susquehanna River Hawks football players
High school football coaches in Pennsylvania
Players of American football from Pennsylvania